Stephen John Martin Lennox (born 16 November 1964) was a footballer who played in the English Football League for Torquay United and Stoke City.

Career
Lennox played for his local side Aberdeen's youth team before he joined English First Division side Stoke City in 1982. He failed to make an impact with Stoke and made just two appearances in the 1982–83 season. He spent the next season on loan to Torquay United before he was released from his Stoke contract in 1984 and Lennox returned to Scotland with Montrose. He later went on to play for Forfar Athletic, Peterhead, East Fife and Huntly.

Career statistics
Source:

References

External links
 

Scottish footballers
Stoke City F.C. players
Torquay United F.C. players
English Football League players
1964 births
Living people
Huntly F.C. players
Montrose F.C. players
Forfar Athletic F.C. players
Peterhead F.C. players
East Fife F.C. players
Scottish Football League players
Footballers from Aberdeen
Association football midfielders